The steppe field mouse (Apodemus witherbyi) is a species of rodent in the family Muridae found in Georgia, Armenia, Azerbaijan, Israel, Turkey, Jordan, Iran, Turkmenistan, Pakistan, and probably Afghanistan, Iraq, Lebanon, and Syria.  The Mount Hermon field mouse (sometimes recognized as a distinct species: A. hermonensis) and the yellow-breasted field mouse (sometimes recognized as a distinct species: A. fulvipectus) were considered conspecific with the steppe field mouse by Musser and Carleton (2005).

References

Apodemus
Rats of Asia
Mammals of Azerbaijan
Mouse, Steppe Field
Mammals described in 1902
Taxa named by Oldfield Thomas
Taxonomy articles created by Polbot